A Companion to the History of the Book is a book first published by Wiley-Blackwell in 2007 in the Blackwell Companions series. It was issued in a second edition in two volumes in 2019. The editors are Simon Eliot, professor of the History of the Book at the University of London, and Jonathan Rose.

References 

2007 books
History of books